Vansda is one of the 182 Legislative Assembly constituencies of Gujarat state in India. It is part of Navsari district and is reserved for candidates belonging to the Scheduled Tribes. It was created by the 2008 delimitation.

List of segments
This assembly seat represents the following segments,

 Vansda Taluka
 Chikhli Taluka (Part) Villages – Jogwad, Kangvai, Ranverikalla, Ranverikhurd, Kharoli, Kukeri, Surkhai, Rankuwa, Manekpor, Harangam, Donja, Sadadvel, Bamanvel, Khambhda, Khudvel, Fadvel, Saravani, Ambach, Kanbhai, Syada, Kaliyari, Bamanwada, Amadhara, Mograwadi, Gholar, Godthal, Velanpor, Kakadvel, Mandav Khadak, Agasi, Rumla, Nadagdhari, Dhama Dhuma, Ghodvani, Zari, Dholumber, Toranvera, Panikhadak, Kakadveri, Pati.

Members of Legislative Assembly
2012 - Chhanabhai Chaudhari, Indian National Congress

Election results

2022

2017

2012

See also
 List of constituencies of Gujarat Legislative Assembly
 Gujarat Legislative Assembly

References

External links
 

Assembly constituencies of Gujarat
Navsari district